Słodowa Island is a small islet on the Oder River within the Wrocław Old Town.

Słodowa Island used to be called Vorderbleiche (pol. Bielarska Przednia) until 1945. Originally the name came from bleaching linen for the Order of Saint Clare. The island was owned by the Order of Saint Claire from the Middle Ages until the beginning of the 18th century, when it became the property of the city. In the 18th century Słodowa Island was connected to Młyńska and Bielarska Islands with the iron bridge. In the second half of the 19th century, people began to build dwelling houses on it with sewerage systems, phones and electricity. In 1945 the German army installed field artillery there, which made it a target for frequent bombardment during World War II. During the siege of Wrocław at the end of World War II, almost all the buildings of the island were destroyed. There were only some of the buildings left, including the thirteenth-century St. Clare's Mills.

St. Clare's Mills were blown up by sappers in 1975 on the order of Wrocław mayor, Marian Czubiński.  The decision was met with widespread criticism and protests by the people of culture, architects, and urban planners. For nearly a quarter century after the destruction of mills, the area remained almost completely undeveloped, with only one house left on the island.

'Wyspa Słodowa' is also the name of the street connecting Słodowa Island with Młyńska Island, and further with St. Jadwiga street on Piasek Island. This is why Tumski Hotel uses address: Wyspa Słodowa 10, despite the fact that it is actually located on the Młyńska Island.

Słodowa Island and neighbouring Piasek Island host many cultural events and concerts, especially during the summer season. In has frequently served as a venue for events associated with the Students' Holidays in May. In 2008 the island was one of the venues of the international street art exhibition "External Artists / Out of Sth", during which Italian artist Blu created a mural called "Statue of Enslavement".

On 5 July 2018, Wyspa Słodowa was designated as one of five locations in Wrocław where alcohol consumption is allowed in public. It is the only such place in the city centre.

References 

Islands of Poland
Districts of Wrocław